Quinten Dekkers (born 4 January 2001) is a Dutch professional footballer who plays as a right-back for Koninklijke HFC.

Club career
On 26 April 2020, Dekkers signed his first professional contract with Jong AZ. He made his professional debut with Jong AZ in a 6–1 Eerste Divisie loss to NAC Breda on 29 August 2020.

International career
Born in the Netherlands, Dekkers is of Indonesian descent through his mother. He is a youth international for the Netherlands.

References

External links
 
 Ons Oranje U16 Profile

2001 births
Living people
Footballers from Amsterdam
Dutch footballers
Netherlands youth international footballers
Dutch people of Indonesian descent
Association football fullbacks
Jong AZ players
Koninklijke HFC players
Eerste Divisie players